Mia S. McLeod (born August 19, 1968) is an independent American politician serving as a member of the South Carolina Senate from the 22nd district. She previously served in the South Carolina House of Representatives from 2011 to 2016. On June 3, 2021, McLeod announced her candidacy for the 2022 South Carolina gubernatorial election. With this announcement she became the first Black woman to run for Governor in South Carolina, generating national and international headlines.

Early life

McLeod is the daughter of the late James S. and Shirley J. McLeod. McLeod earned a Bachelor of Arts degree from the University of South Carolina and a Juris Doctor from the University of South Carolina School of Law.

Career 
Prior to her election to the South Carolina State Legislature, McLeod worked in various state agencies including the Office of the South Carolina Attorney General.

In response to recent restrictions on abortion rights in her state, McLeod sponsored a bill (H. 4544) in December 2015 that would impose similar restrictions for access to Viagra and similar drugs that treat erectile dysfunction. During her career, McLeod has criticized what she describes as the "old guard" of South Carolina politics.

McLeod was among a number of African American women from around the United States who endorsed Hillary Rodham Clinton for President in 2016.

McLeod serves on the Senate Corrections and Penology; Family and Veterans' Services; Judiciary; Medical Affairs, and Rules Committees.

In 2021, she announced her candidacy for Governor of South Carolina. She was defeated in the Democratic primary by former United States Representative Joe Cunningham. On January 10, 2023, she announced her decision to leave the Democratic Party.

Electoral History

References

External links
 
Legislative page

1968 births
20th-century African-American people
20th-century African-American women
21st-century African-American politicians
21st-century African-American women
21st-century American politicians
21st-century American women politicians
African-American state legislators in South Carolina
African-American women in politics
Living people
Democratic Party members of the South Carolina House of Representatives
People from Bennettsville, South Carolina
People from Lancaster, South Carolina
University of South Carolina alumni
Women state legislators in South Carolina
Women in the South Carolina State Senate